One Size Fits All is the tenth studio album by Frank Zappa and the Mothers of Invention, released in June 1975. It is the band's last studio album. A special four-channel quadraphonic version of the album was advertised but not released.

Band
The album features the summer/fall 1974 lineup of the Mothers of Invention, with keyboardist/vocalist George Duke, drummer Chester Thompson, percussionist Ruth Underwood, bass guitarist Tom Fowler and saxophonist/vocalist Napoleon Murphy Brock. “Can’t Afford No Shoes” features James Youman instead of Fowler. When Fowler had broken his hand while on tour, Youman temporarily replaced him.

Album content
The album features one of Zappa's most complex tracks, "Inca Roads".  One of Zappa's heroes, Johnny "Guitar" Watson, guests on two tracks ("flambé" vocals on the out-choruses of "San Ber'dino" and "Andy"). Captain Beefheart also appears under a pseudonym.

Zappa stated in the liner notes that the album was recorded simultaneously with their next album, but this "next album" would be replaced by Bongo Fury, consisting mostly of live recordings with Beefheart from May 1975. From comments Zappa made in radio interviews in April 1975, it seems likely that the unreleased next album would have included "Greggery Peccary," which first appeared three years later on Studio Tan.

Releases
Early U.S. LP pressings of One Size Fits All are notable in that they have the catalog number "BS 2879" inscribed - and crossed out - in the runoff matrix, indicating that at one point One Size Fits All was (perhaps mistakenly) planned to be released on Warner Bros. Records, whose Reprise Records subsidiary distributed Zappa's DiscReet Records label.  The album was ultimately released on DiscReet with a catalog number in Reprise's sequence, DS 2216.  Warner Bros. did not reassign the number BS 2879 to another album.

One Size Fits All was first released on CD by Rykodisc in 1988. It was reissued by Rykodisc in 1995 with restored cover art, but with identical sound quality. In 1996 a 24-karat gold Au20 edition was released with significantly improved sound quality. In 2012 it was remastered and reissued yet again by the Universal Music Group under the Zappa Records imprint.

Critical reception 
Village Voice critic Robert Christgau wrote in his review: "Zappa's music has gotten a little slicker rhythmically—which is what happens when you consort with jazz guys—but basically it's unchanged. And his satire has neither improved nor deteriorated—if his contempt would be beneath an overbright high school junior, there's also a brief lieder parody that I'd love to jam onto WQXR."

Track listing

Personnel

Musicians
 Frank Zappa – guitar, lead (4, 6, 9) and backing vocals
 George Duke – keyboards, lead (1, 8, 9) and backing vocals, synthesizer
 Napoleon Murphy Brock – flute, lead (5, 8) and backing vocals, tenor saxophone
 Ruth Underwood – marimba, vibraphone, percussion
 Chester Thompson – drums, sound effects, voices
 Tom Fowler – bass guitar (all but 2)
 James "Bird Legs" Youman – bass guitar (2)
 Johnny "Guitar" Watson – vocals (7, 8)
 Captain Beefheart (credited as 'Bloodshot Rollin' Red') – harmonica (7)

Production
 Kerry McNabb – engineer, remixing
 Cal Schenkel – design, illustrations, paintings
 Mike D. Stone of the Record Plant – engineer
 Michael Braunstein – engineer
 Unity – assistant engineer
 Dick Barber – assistant engineer, assistant
 Gary O. – engineer
 Ferenc Dobronyi – design
 J.E. Tully – design
 Coy Featherstone – assistant engineer
 Paul Hof – assistant engineer, assistant
 Matti Laipio – voices, assistant engineer
 Bill Romero – voices, assistant engineer
 Richard "Tex" Abel – assistant engineer, assistant
 Jukka – engineer

Charts

References

External links
Lyrics and information
Release details

1975 albums
Albums produced by Frank Zappa
DiscReet Records albums
Frank Zappa albums